SatRev S.A. is a Polish company established in 2016, that specialises in building small, lightweight, nanosatellites. The company was listed in the NASA's "State of the Art Small Spacecraft Technology" report as one of 12 in the world.

Satellites 
STORK is a planned 3U cubesat constellation that will consist of 14 earth observation satellites equipped with SatRev's Vision-300 imager, capable of a ground resolution of up to 5 m. In June 2021 SatRev placed the first two satellites, STORK-4 and STORK-5 Marta, on the Low Earth Orbit using Virgin Orbit LauncherOne rocket. Two more satellites, STORK-1 and STORK-2, have been launched on 13 January 2022 with a SpaceX Falcon 9 Block 5 rocket as part of the Transporter-3 mission while another one, STORK-3, has been launched on the same day by Virgin Orbit using a LauncherOne rocket. STORK-6 launched on 9 January 2023 with the LauncherOne rocket of Virgin Orbit. The launch was a failure and STORK-6 did not achieve orbit.

SW1FT is a 3U cubesat for Earth imaging purposes that has been launched on 13 January 2022 together with STORK-1 and STORK-2 on a Falcon 9 Block 5 rocket.

LabSat is a 3U cubesat that serves as a scientific platform for in-orbit experiments developed by polish academic institutions, including the Wrocław University of Science and Technology. It was too launched on 13 January 2022 as part of the Transporter-3 mission on a Falcon 9 Block 5 rocket.

In February 2022 the Sultanate of Oman, SatRev, Virgin Orbit and Tuatara together signed a Memorandum of Understanding for collaboration on Oman’s first mission to deep space. SatRevolution planned to put the first Omani nanosatellite into orbit by the end of 2022. The satellite was expected to be launched from Spaceport Cornwall in the United Kingdom aboard the Virgin Orbit LauncherOne rocket. The satellite, named AMAN, was launched on 9 January 2023 from Spaceport Cornwall by Virgin Orbit with their LauncherOne rocket; the launch was a failure and the satellite did not achieve orbit.

Future launches 
Virgin Orbit considered launching satellites from SatRev on its planned mission to Mars in 2022 (the mission did not happen in 2022).

See also 
 List of spaceflight launches in July–December 2021
 List of spaceflight launches in January-June 2022
 List of proposed Solar System spacecraft
 List of missions to Mars

References

External links
 

Polish companies established in 2016
Spacecraft manufacturers
Aerospace companies of Poland
Companies based in Wrocław